The 1977 Soviet First League was the seventh season of the Soviet First League and the 37th season of the Soviet second tier league competition.

Final standings

Number of teams by union republic

See also
 Soviet First League

External links
 1977 season. RSSSF

1977
2
Soviet
Soviet